Gaëtan Bussmann (born 2 February 1991) is a French professional footballer who plays for  club Nancy. He plays as a left-back and is also capable of playing in the centre of defence. Bussmann is a French youth international and has represented his nation at U18 and U19 level. He was a part of the team that won the 2010 European U19 Championship on home soil.

Career

Early career and Metz
Born in Épinal, Bussmann began his career at hometown club Épinal and joined Metz in 2004 at the age of 13. While in the club's youth academy, he won the 2009–10 Coupe Gambardella after the club's under-19 team defeated Sochaux 5–4 on penalties in the final. On 4 June 2010, Bussmann signed his first professional contract agreeing to a five-year deal with Metz until June 2015. He made his professional debut on 20 August 2010 in a league match against Vannes starting in the left back position.

Mainz 05
In August 2015, Bussmann left Metz to join German Bundesliga side Mainz 05 for a transfer fee of believed to be €1 million. He signed a two-year contract including an extension option and replaced Park Joo-ho who had moved from Mainz to Borussia Dortmund.

In January 2018, Bussmann joined league rivals SC Freiburg on loan until the end of the season. Freiburg were also given an option to sign him permanently. He did not make an appearance during his half season there.

In summer 2018, Bussmann returned to Mainz 05. On 29 September, he earned his first Bundesliga match after 574 days, deputising for Aarón who had played the first five matches of the season.

Nancy
On 22 July 2022, Bussmann signed a two-year contract with Nancy.

Career statistics

Honours
Metz
 Coupe Gambardella: 2009–10

France U19
 UEFA European Under-19 Championship: 2010

References

External links
 FC Metz club profile
 

1991 births
Living people
Sportspeople from Épinal
French footballers
Association football fullbacks
France youth international footballers
SAS Épinal players
FC Metz players
1. FSV Mainz 05 players
SC Freiburg players
SC Freiburg II players
1. FSV Mainz 05 II players
En Avant Guingamp players
FC Erzgebirge Aue players
AS Nancy Lorraine players
Championnat National 2 players
Ligue 2 players
Championnat National players
Ligue 1 players
Bundesliga players
Regionalliga players
2. Bundesliga players
French expatriate footballers
Expatriate footballers in Germany
French expatriate sportspeople in Germany
Footballers from Grand Est
20th-century French people
21st-century French people